Sotae station is a subway station on Gwangju Metro Line 1 in Dong-gu, Gwangju, South Korea. It is named after the Sotae Valley, a large valley of Mudeungsan.

Design
It encompasses a circuit road that reduces traffic congestion caused by heavy traffic volume entering this area from Hwasun, parking lots, and bike parking lots near the station. It is designed to enhance pedestrian safety by securing 3.5–5 meter-wide sidewalks on both sides of the roads.

It is a control station in charge of Hakdong–Jeungsimsa station and Dolgogae station.

Station layout

See also
 Transportation in South Korea

References

Dong District, Gwangju
Gwangju Metro stations
Railway stations opened in 2004